Jonathan Barron (born 2 March 1937) is a retired English snooker player. He won the 1970 World Amateur Snooker Championship and was the first player to win the English Amateur Championship in three consecutive years.

Career 
Barron was born on 2 March 1937. He started playing snooker when he was about 10, on a three-quarter size table above his father's shop in the village of Mevagissey.

He first reached the final of the English Amateur Championship in 1962, where he was defeated 9–11 by Ron Gross. He won the 1962–63 Television Tournament, a pro–am event, and also a televised amateur tournament the following season. He was runner-up again in 1969, 9–11 to Ray Edmonds. He gained the title in 1970 by defeating Sid Hood 11–10 in the final, and retained it in 1971 with an 11–7 defeat of Doug French. In 1972, he was again the champion, prevailing 11–9 against Edmonds, thereby becoming the first player to win the title in three consecutive years. He was the first English Amateur champion since 1961 not to turn professional. Barron and Ray Reardon travelled to South Africa to play a "test match" series against Mannie Francisco and Jimmy van Rensberg in 1967, winning by two matches to one.

Barron represented England at the 1970 World Amateur Snooker Championship, winning five of his six group matches to reach the final, where he defeated Gross 11–7 to win the title. Attempting to defend his title at the 1972 World Amateur Snooker Championship, he won all three of his group matches, but then lost 6–8 to Edmonds in the semi-finals.

According to Barron, he retired from most competitive snooker after the 1972 World Amateur Championship (held in January 1973) to allow more time to focus on his family and business, although he did continue to play in local league games until 2000. He ran a curio shop in Mevagissey.

Career highlights

References

Sportspeople from Cornwall
1937 births
Living people
English snooker players
People from Mevagissey